Andrew Francis Donnelly (19 July 1900 – 22 April 1964) was an Australian rules footballer who played for the Essendon Football Club in the Victorian Football League (VFL).

Andy's younger brother was Gerry Donnelly.

Notes

External links 
		

1900 births
1964 deaths
Australian rules footballers from Melbourne
Essendon Football Club players
North Melbourne Football Club (VFA) players
People from West Melbourne, Victoria